Bidston railway station is a railway station that serves the village of Bidston, Merseyside, England.  The station is situated at the junction of the West Kirby branch of the Wirral line, which is part of the Merseyrail network, and serves as the northern terminal for the Borderlands line from Wrexham Central, operated by Transport for Wales.

History
Bidston station has for most of its existence been primarily an interchange point between trains. The station is relatively isolated except for nearby Bidston Village, and was accessed only by foot. Until 1970, the approach road to the station was an unpaved track. Because of its isolation when a through station, the station closed twice due to poor passenger usage. Today there is an adjacent car park at the station with access to the nearby Junction One retail park via a lane. The station's prime function as an interchange still remains today.

The station was originally built by the Hoylake Railway, opening on 2 July 1866 as an intermediate through station on their line from Birkenhead Dock to the east to Hoylake to the west. The Birkenhead Dock terminus was a tramway railway interchange station, with onward journeys to Birkenhead Woodside ferry by horse drawn street trams of the Wirral Tramway. The station first closed on 4 July 1870, reopening on 1 August 1872. In 1878 the Hoylake Railway line was extended to West Kirby on the River Dee coast to the west. In 1888 the line was extended to Birkenhead Park station. Birkenhead Park was an interchange station to Liverpool via the Mersey Railway. The old tramway interchange terminus at Birkenhead Dock station was converted to a goods station.

The station was again closed in June 1890 due to low passenger numbers. The station was permanently reopened on 18 May 1896 as the northern terminus of the new North Wales and Liverpool Railway. The southern terminus was at Hawarden Bridge, which joined onto the Wrexham, Mold and Connah's Quay Railway line to Wrexham Central. In 1898 Bidston ceased to be a terminus station with the line extended to Seacombe in Wallasey. Bidston became a passenger interchange station.

Through trains to Liverpool commenced in 1938 when the London Midland and Scottish Railway electrified the line from Birkenhead Park to West Kirby. During the earlier half of the twentieth century, Bidston station was known as Bidston Dee Junction and was a busy interchange between the Wirral line electric services and the Seacombe to Wrexham and Chester Northgate steam trains. In 1960 the Wrexham service changed to diesel trains. At the same time the northern terminus of the line was diverted further north to terminate at New Brighton due to the closure of Seacombe station. The section of line from Bidston to New Brighton was closed in 1971 due to poor passenger use with the line from Wrexham terminating at Birkenhead North. However it was subsequently cut back to Bidston and again the station became a terminus on the Borderlands Line in October 1978 and this remains the situation today.

The section of curve between Bidston West and North Junctions, on the wye to the east of the station, was severed on 28 November 1983. This removed the direct route to New Brighton for passengers, and Bidston Dock for freight.

Signal boxes
Bidston had four signal boxes in 1899. These signal boxes were situated alongside the Dee, West, East and North junctions. The nearest to the station was the Bidston Dee Junction box. The second Dee Junction signal box was built in the 1930s by the London, Midland and Scottish Railway, and was much larger than the earlier signal box which had been built by the Wirral Railway. This signal box had a 65-lever frame and also took over the operation of Bidston North Junction, when built. Bidston Dee Junction signal box was closed on 17 September 1994, and demolished two months later on 20 November.

Engine shed and freight use

Bidston station had a nearby engine shed, shed code 6F, which principally operated the Wrexham line. The building was somewhat south of the running lines, halfway between Bidston and Birkenhead North stations. The shed was built by the Manchester, Sheffield and Lincolnshire Railway in 1897 and had two tracks inside. The shed had a water tank and a coaling stage for steam locomotives. Examples of locomotives, which could be found at the shed, included the LNER Class J94 Austerity, which was used around the Birkenhead docks, and the BR Standard Class 9F, which hauled iron ore trains from Bidston Dock to the John Summers steelworks in Shotton. The engine shed closed on 11 February 1963, along with transfer of its allocation of locomotives to Birkenhead Mollington Street depot. The shed remained intact for several years after closure.

Several sidings were situated adjacent to the eastern side of the station, south of the running lines. These sidings had been built prior to 1899, and were removed after goods traffic ended on 29 July 1968. A Tesco supermarket now occupies the site of these sidings.

The station was the nearest to the former Bidston Dock. The adjacent Bidston East Junction gives access to the former Birkenhead Dock Branch line, but this has been disused by freight workings since the mid-1980s and is still so at present.

Facilities
The station has a booking office, shelter and toilet facilities. Each side of the island platform can receive six carriages. The station is staffed at all times during opening hours, and has platform CCTV. Each platform has open-air seating. There is a payphone, next to the ticket office, on platform 1. The station provides a "Park and Ride" service. There are a further 198 car parking spaces, which are free to use for travellers, with lighting columns and CCTV to meet Merseytravel's Travelsafe requirements. Construction of the new car park was completed in 2010. There is no access to the platform for passengers with wheelchairs or prams, as access is by staircase only. On 3 August 2015, a new Bike & Go shelter opened at the station. This provides secure cycle storage for 28 cycles.

Services

Currently, services run every 15 minutes (Monday to Saturday daytime) to West Kirby & Liverpool, and every hour to Wrexham.  Services to and from Wrexham usually terminate/start from platform 2, which is also used by West Kirby trains.  Liverpool-bound trains use platform 1.

During the evenings, trains operate every 30 minutes to West Kirby & Liverpool and every two hours to Wrexham (all day on Bank Holidays), with a service approximately every 90 minutes on Sundays.

Merseyrail services are provided by Merseyrail's fleet of Class 507 and Class 508 EMUs. Services to Wrexham are usually provided by a Transport for Wales, double-carriage, Class 150/2 "Sprinter" DMU.

Future
Proposals have been made to electrify some or all of the Borderlands Line and possibly incorporate it into the Wirral Line services, but no commitment has been made.

References

Bibliography

External links

 The Wrexham-Bidston Line
 Welcome to the Borderlands Line

Railway stations in the Metropolitan Borough of Wirral
DfT Category E stations
Former Wirral Railway stations
Railway stations in Great Britain opened in 1866
Railway stations in Great Britain closed in 1870
Railway stations in Great Britain opened in 1872
Railway stations in Great Britain closed in 1890
Railway stations in Great Britain opened in 1896
Railway stations served by Transport for Wales Rail
Railway stations served by Merseyrail
1866 establishments in England